Goliathus cacicus, the chief goliath, is a species of beetles of the family Scarabaeidae.

Description
The presence of sexual dichromatism in this species of beetle can be traced to the randomly structured filaments in the elytra of both males and females, contributing to vast differences in coloration and luster. Males commonly appear iridescent, while females are white and lack luster and iridescence. Within the last decade, research in Shanghai has further explored the role of structural differences in determining the appearance of the Goliathus cacicus. This research focuses on both visual appearance and the UV scale.

Distribution
This species is present in Liberia, Equatorial Guinea, Ivory Coast, Burkina Faso, Nigeria, Sierra Leone, and Ghana.

References

Cetoniinae
Beetles described in 1789